Jean-Baptiste Lemoyne or Moyne (3 April 1751 – 30 December 1796) was a French composer, chiefly of operas.

Born in Eymet, Dordogne, he first worked as a musician in Berlin and Warsaw, where in 1775 he produced his first opera, Le bouquet de Colette, starring his pupil Antoinette de Saint-Huberty (née Clavel). He returned to France and wrote the tragic opera Électre, which received its premiere in 1782. Lemoyne claimed his music was following the example of Christoph Willibald Gluck, then the greatest influence on French opera, but when Électre failed, Gluck rejected any association with the younger composer. Lemoyne turned to Gluck's rivals, Niccolò Piccinni and Antonio Sacchini, as musical models for his next two tragedies, Phèdre (1786) and the Egyptian-set Nephté (1789), which had more success. His later operas are less important. He died in Paris.

Operas
 Le bouquet de Colette, premiered 1775 in Warsaw
 Électre, tragédie lyrique in three acts, libretto by Nicolas-François Guillard, premiered 2 July 1782 at the Académie Royale de Musique (Paris opera)
 Phèdre, tragédie lyrique in three acts, libretto by François-Benoît Hoffman, premiered 26 October 1786 at Fontainebleau
 Nadir, ou Le dormeur éveillé, 1787, unstaged "for purely financial reasons"
 Nephté, tragédie lyrique in three acts, libretto by François-Benoît Hoffman, premiered 15 December 1789 at the Académie Royale de Musique (Paris Opera)
 Les pommiers et le moulin, comédie lyrique, premiered 22 January 1790 at the Académie Royale de Musique (Paris Opera)
 Louis IX en Égypte, opéra, libretto by Guillard and Andrieux, premiered 15 June 1790
 Elfrida, libretto by Guillard, premiered 17 December 1791 at the Théâtre des Italiens (the Opéra-Comique)
 Miltiade à Marathon, opéra, libretto by Guillard, premiered 5 November 1793 at the Paris Opera
 Toute la Grèce, ou Ce que peut la liberté, tableau patriotique, libretto by Beffroy de Reigny, premiered 5 January 1794 at the Paris Opera
 Le compère Luc, ou Les dangers de l'ivrognerie, opera in two acts, premiered 19 February 1794 at the Théâtre Feydeau
 Les vrais sans-culottes, ou L'hospitalité républicaine, tableau patriotique avec chants, libretto by Rézicourt, premiered 12 May 1794
 Le mensonge officieux, comédie in one act, libretto by Nicolas-Julien Forgeot, premiered 13 March 1795 at the Cirque National

References

Sources

External links
 

French male classical composers
French opera composers
Male opera composers
French Classical-period composers
1751 births
1796 deaths
People from Dordogne
18th-century classical composers
18th-century French composers
18th-century French male musicians